Möst is a sum (district) of Khovd Province in western Mongolia. The sum is 180 km away from the city of Khovd.

References 

Districts of Khovd Province